Byrsia buruana is a moth of the family Erebidae. It is found on Buru.

References

Lithosiini
Moths described in 1929